Oven Fork is an unincorporated community in Letcher County, Kentucky. Oven Fork had a post office from 1948 to 1993.

References

Unincorporated communities in Letcher County, Kentucky
Unincorporated communities in Kentucky